Diploschizia impigritella, the yellow nutsedge moth or the five-barred glyphipterid moth, is a species of sedge moth in the genus Diploschizia. It was described by James Brackenridge Clemens in 1862. It is found in North America, from Newfoundland to Florida, west to Texas and North Dakota. It has also been recorded from California.

The wingspan is 7–9 mm. The forewings are black to dark reddish brown with five white crescents along the costal margin and a large crescent at the center of the inner margin. The hindwings are dark gray with long hair-like fringe scales. Adults are on wing from early May to early November.

The larvae feed on Cyperus esculentus. They bore in the stems and leaf sheaths of their host plant.

References

External links
 Diploschizia impigritella at Zipcodezoo.com

Moths described in 1862
Glyphipterigidae